Jim Goonan may refer to:

 Alf Goonan (1904–1942), Australian rules footballer for North Melbourne
 Jim H. Goonan (1873–1950), Australian rules footballer for Carlton